Giuliana Penzi (October 1, 1918, in Ravenna – January 17, 2008, in Rome) was an Italian dancer and choreographer who was a Guest Ballerina at the Rome Opera House and the director of the Accademia Nazionale di Danza. She trained at La Scala ballet school in Milan and shortly after her graduation, along with Russian émigrée Jia Ruskaja, co-founded the Rome Academy in 1940.

External links
 La danza dice addio a Giuliana dai capelli di fuoco Obituary by Donatella Bertozzi published on January 17, 2008, in Il Messaggero  
  - Complete video about lecture on biography Giuliana dai capelli di fuoco 

Italian ballerinas
People from Ravenna
1918 births
2008 deaths